Zhang Mingjie (born September 1966) is a Chinese structural biologist. He is Kerry Holdings Professor of Science and the Chair Professor of Biochemistry in the Department of Biochemistry at Hong Kong University of Science and Technology (HKUST). He was an overseas assessor of the Chinese Academy of Science. His research is focusing on molecular mechanisms of organization and regulation of neuronal signaling complexes and machineries in controlling cell polarity by using protein crystallography and NMR spectroscopy. In 2006, his structural and biochemical studies in signal transduction complex organization was rewarded for the State Natural Science Award (Second Prize), which is one of the most important national awards of science in China.

Biography
Zhang was born in Ningbo, Zhejiang in September 1966, when the Cultural Revolution broke out. He obtained his B.Sc. in Chemistry from Fudan University in 1988 and earned his Ph.D. in Biochemistry from University of Calgary in 1993. On December 4, 2020, he was recruited as dean of the newly founded College of Life Science, Southern University of Science and Technology.

Awards
1994, President's List, Natural Sciences and Engineering Research Council of Canada (NSERC) Doctoral Prize
2002, Outstanding Overseas Young Scientist Award by the Natural Science Foundation of China
2003, the Croucher Foundation Senior Research Fellow Award 			     	 
2006, The State Natural Science Award (Second Prize)
2011, HLHL Advancement Prize
2018, Croucher Senior Research Fellowships

References

External links
 Mingjie Zhang's page at HKUST
 Mingjie Zhang's lab homepage

Living people
Biologists from Zhejiang
Chemists from Zhejiang
Educators from Ningbo
Fudan University alumni
Academic staff of the Hong Kong University of Science and Technology
Members of the Chinese Academy of Sciences
Scientists from Ningbo
University of Calgary alumni
1966 births
Members of the Election Committee of Hong Kong, 2021–2026